David Haussler (born 1953) is an American bioinformatician known for his work leading the team that assembled the first human genome sequence in the race to complete the Human Genome Project and subsequently for comparative genome analysis that deepens understanding the molecular function and evolution of the genome.

Haussler was elected a member of the National Academy of Engineering in 2018 for developments in computational learning theory and bioinformatics, including first assembly of the human genome, its analysis, and data sharing.

He is a distinguished professor of biomolecular engineering and founding scientific director of the UC Santa Cruz Genomics Institute at the University of California, Santa Cruz, director of the California Institute for Quantitative Biosciences (QB3) on the UC Santa Cruz campus, and a consulting professor at the Stanford University School of Medicine and the UC San Francisco Biopharmaceutical Sciences Department.

Education 
Haussler studied art briefly at the Academy of Art in San Francisco in 1971 and then psychotherapy at Immaculate Heart College in Hollywood until 1973, when he transferred to Connecticut College, finishing in 1975 with a major in mathematics and minor in physics. He earned an MS in applied mathematics from California Polytechnic University in San Luis Obispo in 1979. Haussler received his PhD in computer science from the University of Colorado at Boulder in 1982.

Career and research 
During summers while he was in college, Haussler worked for his brother, Mark Haussler, a biochemist at the University of Arizona studying vitamin D metabolism. They were the first to measure the levels of Calcitriol, the hormonal form of vitamin D, in the human bloodstream. Between 1975 and 1979 he traveled and worked a variety of jobs, including a job at a petroleum refinery in Burghausen, Germany, tomato farming on Crete, and farming kiwifruit, almonds, and walnuts in Templeton, CA. While in Templeton he worked on his Master's degree at nearby California Polytechnic University.

Haussler was an assistant professor in Mathematics and Computer Science at the University of Denver in Colorado from 1982-1986. From 1986 to the present, he has been at UC Santa Cruz, initially in the Computer Science Department, and in 2004 as an inaugural member of the Biomolecular Engineering Department.

While pursuing his doctorate in theoretical computer science at the University of Colorado, Haussler became interested in the mathematical analysis of DNA along with fellow students Gene Myers, Gary Stormo, and Manfred Warmuth. Haussler's current research stems from his early work in machine learning. In 1988 he organized the first Workshop on Computational learning Theory with Leonard Pitt. With Blumer, Ehrenfeucht, and Warmuth he introduced the Vapnik-Chervonenkis framework to computational learning theory, solving some problems posed by Leslie Valiant. In the 1990s he obtained various results in information theory, empirical processes, artificial intelligence, neural networks, statistical decision theory, and pattern recognition. At present, his lab grows human cerebral organoids for neurodevelopmental disease research and to explore human neural circuit formation and learning.

Haussler’s research combines mathematics, computer science, and molecular biology. He develops new statistical and algorithmic methods to explore the molecular function and evolution of the human genome, integrating cross-species comparative and high-throughput genomics data to study gene structure, function, and regulation. He is credited with pioneering the use of Hidden Markov models (HMMs), stochastic context-free grammars, and the discriminative kernel method for analyzing DNA, RNA, and protein sequences. He was the first to apply the latter methods to the genome-wide search for gene expression biomarkers in cancer, now a major effort of his laboratory.

As a collaborator on the international Human Genome Project, his team, featuring programming work by graduate student Jim Kent, computationally assembled the first draft of the human genome and posted it on the Internet on July 7, 2000. Following this, his team developed the UCSC Genome Browser, a web-based tool that is used extensively in biomedical research and serves as the platform for several large-scale genomics projects. These include the National Human Genome Research Institute (NHGRI)’s ENCODE project to use omics methods to explore the function of every base in the human genome (for which UCSC served as the Data Coordination Center), NIH’s Mammalian Gene Collection, NHGRI’s 1000 genomes project to explore human genetic variation, the Human Pangenome Reference Consortium to replace the single reference human genome with a collection of genomes from around the world, and the National Cancer Institute (NCI) Cancer Genome Atlas project to explore the genomic changes in cancer.

His group’s informatics work on cancer genomics, including the UCSC Cancer Genomics Browser, provides a complete analysis pipeline from raw DNA reads through the detection and interpretation of mutations and altered gene expression in tumor samples. His group collaborates with researchers at medical centers nationally, including members of the Stand Up To Cancer “Dream Teams” and the Cancer Genome Atlas, to discover molecular causes of cancer and develop a new personalized, genomics-based approach to cancer treatment.

Haussler is one of eight organizing committee members of the Global Alliance for Genomic and Clinical Data Sharing, along with David Altshuler from the Broad Institute of Harvard and MIT; Peter Goodhand and Thomas Hudson from the Ontario Institute for Cancer Research; Brad Margus from the A-T Children's Project; Elizabeth Nabel from Brigham and Women's Hospital; Charles Sawyers from Memorial Sloan-Kettering; and Michael Stratton from Wellcome Trust Sanger Institute.

He co-founded the Genome 10K Project (now superseded by the Vertebrate Genomes Project) to assemble a genomic zoo—a collection of DNA sequences representing the genomes of 10,000 vertebrate species—to capture genetic diversity as a resource for the life sciences and for worldwide conservation efforts.

Awards and honors 
Haussler is a member of the National Academy of Sciences, the National Academy of Engineering, and the American Academy of Arts and Sciences and a Fellow of the Association for the Advancement of Artificial Intelligence (AAAI). His awards include the 2011 Weldon Memorial Prize from University of Oxford, the 2009 American Society of Human Genetics (ASHG) Curt Stern Award in Human Genetics, the 2008 ISCB Senior Scientist Award from the International Society for Computational Biology (who also elected him an ISCB Fellow in 2009), the 2005 Dickson Prize for Science from Carnegie Mellon University, and the 2003 Association for Computing Machinery (ACM)/Association for the Advancement of Artificial Intelligence (AAAI) Allen Newell Award in Artificial Intelligence.

With Cyrus Chothia and Michael Waterman, Haussler was awarded the 2015 Dan David Prize for his contributions to the field of bioinformatics.

References

American bioinformaticians
1953 births
Living people
Fellows of the American Academy of Arts and Sciences
Members of the United States National Academy of Sciences
Howard Hughes Medical Investigators
Human Genome Project scientists
University of California, Santa Cruz faculty
Fellows of the Association for the Advancement of Artificial Intelligence
Fellows of the International Society for Computational Biology
University of Colorado alumni
Connecticut College alumni